The European Parliament election of 1984 took place on 17 June 1984.

The Italian Communist Party was narrowly ahead of Christian Democracy in Sardinia. The Sardinian Action Party had a surprisingly good result and was able to elect Mario Melis to the European Parliament in the Islands constituency, thanks to an alliance with several regionalist parties notably including the Valdostan Union, the Trentino Tyrolean People's Party and Liga Veneta.

Results

Source: Ministry of the Interior

See also 
1984 European Parliament election in Italy

Elections in Sardinia
1984 elections in Italy
European Parliament elections in Italy
1984 European Parliament election